Castlemaine Art Museum is an Australian art gallery and museum in Castlemaine, Victoria in the Shire of Mount Alexander. It was founded in 1913. It is housed in a 1931 Art Deco neo-classical building constructed for the purpose, heritage-listed by the National Trust. Its collection concentrates on Australian art and the museum houses historical artefacts and displays drawn from the district.

The Museum is governed by private trustees and managed by a board elected by subscribers and provided with state and local government funding and support from benefactors, local families, artists and patrons. Its trustees also oversee the management of Buda, a heritage-listed villa and garden 1.3 km across Castlemaine in Hunter Street, which houses its own collection of art and artefacts associated with the Leviny family, and is also open to the public for exhibitions, events displays and garden tours.

Collection
The Collections may be searched online.

Museum collection
The museum, housed in the basement, presents the history of Castlemaine and its region in objects, maps, models, diaoramas, photographs and prints, including a large group of hand-coloured lithographs from watercolours by S. T. Gill; pithy vignettes of life on the goldfields. Historical glassware and ceramics, much brought to Castlemaine by its European immigrants, extends from the Roman era. Local fauna is represented by taxidermy specimens. Items of Victorian-era fashion are also displayed, and locally-produced arts and crafts is represented in early-to-mid 20th-century enamelware and silver.

Gallery
The gallery has always specialised in Australian art as the gallery's constitution stipulated in 1913, emphasising "... the cultivation of a taste for the Fine Arts by the collection and exhibition of works of especially Australian Artists..." Accordingly, at its opening in 1931 it held 155 pictures, 26 added only the year prior, and the total predominantly Australian, and now the collection spans the periods Colonial, Impressionist, Early Twentieth Century Modernism, Mid-Century Modern, Postmodernism, and Contemporary in varieties of media.

Earlier artists include Louis Buvelot, Fred McCubbin, Tom Roberts, Arthur Streeton, Violet Teague, May Vale, Walter Withers, Ethel Spowers, David Davies, Rupert Bunny, Max Meldrum, Ethel Carrick, E. Phillips Fox, Jessie Traill, John Russell, Christian Waller, Hugh Ramsay, Clarice Beckett, A.M.E. Bale, Arthur Lindsay and John Longstaff.

Modernists include Margaret Preston, Clifford Last, Ola Cohn, Roland Wakelin, Joy Hester, Russell Drysdale, Judy Cassab, Fred Williams, Klytie Pate, John Brack, Albert Tucker, John Perceval, Clifton Pugh, Lloyd Rees, Danila Vassilieff, and Roger Kemp.

More contemporary artists include Rick Amor, Ray Crooke, Rona Green, Betty Kuntiwa Pumani, Peter Benjamin Graham, Fiona Orr, Robert Jacks, Jeffrey Smart, Diane Mantzaris, Ian Armstrong, Jenny Watson, and Brian Dunlop.

Indigenous art
First Nations art is progressively being transferred from the Museum to the walls and display cases of the Gallery, and its collection is being actively expanded. In 2019 Tiriki Onus, of Yorta Yorta and Dja Dja Wurrung heritage and University of Melbourne Associate Dean Indigenous Development and Head of the Wilin Centre for Indigenous Arts and Cultural Development, became the premier First Nations appointment to the CAM Board. The Art Museum's Strategic Plan released in 2019 and current until 2023 declares;During the life of this Plan, CAM will consult with Traditional Owners towards increasing its engagement with and relevance for Traditional Owners and other Aboriginal and Torres Strait Islander artists and audiences.

Portraits of Australian artists

Portraits of Australian artists by Australian photographers Max Dupain, David Moore, Richard Beck, Jack Cato, Pegg Clarke, Connie Christie, Sonia Payes, Michel Lawrence, Joyce Evans, Mina Moore, Jacqueline Mitelman and Olive Cotton and others form another specialist concentration in the collection initiated by previous Director Peter Perry.

Buda Historic Home 

Separate from the Art Museum, but under the guardianship of the trustees of the Castlemaine Art Gallery and Historical Museum (CAGHM), Buda holds on display domestic items, decorative art, furnishings, artworks, books and personal effects of the Leviny family from the 1850s up until 1981, after Hilda Leviny's death, when the home and garden were opened to the public. Clothing and accessories, documents, correspondence, diaries and photographs preserve the family's history and the eras in which they lived.

Hungarian Ernest Leviny, a practicing gold- and silversmith, arrived on the Castlemaine goldfields in 1853 and the collection of his work is notable. Arts and Crafts style articles of embroidery, woodcarving and metalwork on display throughout the house and garden were produced  by the Leviny daughters.

Also in the Buda collection are original artworks by mostly early twentieth century Australian artists including William Blamire-Young, Margaret Preston, Lionel Lindsay, Mildred Lovett, Ursula Ridley Walker and Alice Newell, studio pottery from the 1920s and 1930s by Klytie Pate, Philippa James and John Campbell, and hand-printed textiles of Melbourne artists Michael O’Connell, Frances Mary Burke and Lucy Newell.

History
The founding of Castlemaine Art Gallery and Historical Museum was preceded by four other public regional galleries in the state of Victoria: Ballarat in 1884, Warrnambool in 1886, Bendigo in 1887 and Geelong in 1900, but its significance, by comparison, was that it was in a small town, not a regional city like its forbears.

A cultural precedent was the 1855 Castlemaine Mechanics Institute which included a library; and numbers of artists, including S. T. Gill, Samuel Calvert, George French Angas, and early photographers Antoine Fauchery and Richard Daintree, had visited to document the swarming goldfields.

Castlemaine Past and Present

The Castlemaine Progress Association's display of items of a 'novel and interesting nature', Castlemaine Past and Present, the town's first major exhibition, running 18–20 August 1910, celebrated the commercial, civic and cultural achievements of the town with "a collection of geological specimens and curios from the Government collection," photographs of historical interest, maps, furniture, applied art, books and artefacts, as well as landscapes by local artists intended to "popularise our town as a resort for artists and painters."

The committee included a "special feature" of "modern art, the only stipulation being that works of art, as well as all other exhibits, must relate in some way to Castlemaine or its district," and called for "historical curios, weapons, maps, manuscripts, medals, trophies, or any other article of local significance." An early supporter was Elioth Gruner. The exhibition thus established the principle of collecting of Australian art and of looking locally, for works connected to Castlemaine in some aspect, in contrast to a policy of concentrating on British and European art that was pursued by most Australian galleries of the period, in particular the National Gallery of Victoria purchases in Europe by L. Bernard Hall through the Felton Bequest.

Public meeting
Two years later, in October 1912, the first solo exhibition of paintings by a local resident, Elsie Barlow, wife of a Castlemaine police magistrate, was held in the reading room of the Mechanics Institute, raising hopes "that the Castlemaine public will have the same opportunity in this matter as is afforded to the Melbourne public, which now-a-days is rarely without an Art Exhibition."

Subsequently, a meeting at Barlow's Hunter Street home on 9 July 1913 proposed the creation of a permanent gallery for Castlemaine and approached the Mayor to "affirm the advisability of establishing a Museum and Art Gallery in Castlemaine" on 30 July at a public meeting of Mayors and Councillors from Chewton, Maldon, Metcalfe, Newstead and Mount Alexander with Col. Davies, Secretary of the Bendigo Art Gallery, Mr A T Woodward Director of the Bendigo School of Arts, Mr Bernard Hall, Director of the National Gallery of Victoria, Trustees of the National Gallery and Museum and the Old Pioneers Association, and with support of the local High School committee.

Winifred Brotherton, who took the minutes, emphasised the imperative of establishing a museum in which to preserve the heritage of the town, and the museum was later to be given her name in her honour.

Colonel Davis spoke from the experience of Bendigo Art Gallery where he was secretary, advising not to expect government funds such as they had received as the grant was only £2,000 to be divided amongst all the arts organisations, but to secure donations of pictures, be prepared to go into debt, and make use of loans from the National Gallery of Victoria. The housing of the gallery was considered and proposals included the cooking classroom of the Technical High School, the Market Building, the Town Hall, and the School of Mines.

Realisation
The gallery became a reality when Bertha Leviny of Buda homestead provided use of a room in a shop in Lyttleton St. for one year free of charge, and Bendigo Art Gallery offered a loan of paintings. A loan exhibition of 30 works in the Stock Exchange Room of the Town Hall launched the Castlemaine Art Gallery and Historical Museum on 24 October 1913. Significant exhibitors who made donations of their work included Harold Herbert and Jessie Traill.

When the gallery moved into the room offered by Leviny in Lyttleton St., more donations were made. Bertha E. Merfield made generous loans of works from her collection to its inaugural exhibition, including paintings by Tudor St George Tucker, Alexander Colquhoun, George Clausen, Frederick McCubbin and Blamire Young. joined by direct loans by artists, and by the National Gallery of Victoria which contributed Franz Courtens' Morning, David Wynfield's Death of the Duke of Buckingham, Robert Dowling's Sheikh and His Son Entering Cairo; Hermann Eschke's Freshwater Bay, Isle of Wight; Cave Thomas' Canute Listening to the Monks at Ely; and Louis Buvelot's Summer afternoon, Templestowe.

The 1914 annual report recorded 30 memberships and a collection of 23 pictures with others on loan and a balance of £75. Initial opening hours in 1914 were daily from 3 to 5 p.m., and Wednesday and Saturday evenings from 7.30 to 9.30, changed later to weekdays 10 am-12 pm and 2-5 pm, and Sundays 2-5 pm.

Nevertheless, the Victorian Government rejected their grant application of 1915 because the Gallery's tenure of its premises was not secure. Electric lighting was added in 1927.

The facility, proved popular, with attendances rising from 800 in 1920 to 3,600 in 1923. Many in 1928 came for a series of talks by John Shirlow intended to boost interest in the Gallery. Artists too were noticing it, as The Age reported in November 1923;'Tis said that the reputation of this gallery is such that every artist of note throughout Australia has heard of the little gallery which so cherishes and encourages the work of Australian men and women that a renaissance of effort has been brought about among Australian painters.The insurance value of the collection rose in 1925 to £2,000, with a further 37 paintings gifted in 1926 by, among others, Arthur Streeton, George Coates, Dora Meeson, Jo Sweatman, and A.M.E. Bale, etchings by Martin Lewis, and purchases including The Dark Horse by George W. Lambert, and The Coming Storm by Blamire Young, as reported by Lieut. Col. Francis S. Newell, then President of the Castlemaine Art Gallery in Art in Australia of December 1926. Newell also commented on attendance by 5,248 visitors; "When it is remembered that the population of this town is about 7,000, the progress of this gallery is remarkable. The committee has now purchased a site for a new building, but more funds are needed before the project can be carried out."

Building

Since 17 November 1983 Castlemaine Art Museum is classified by The National Trust (revised 3 August 1998), which notes its significance as;
… an exceptional building in its intent and execution and … historically important as one of the earliest examples of the "modern movement" in provincial Victoria.

A building fund was set up in 1923 using a donation of £100 by Sir John and Lady Higgins. A site in Templeton Street was purchased for £1200 but later sold to acquire the present block in Lyttleton Street in 1927 for about £300. That year in a visit to Castlemaine the Hon George Prendergast enabled a deputation to seek a grant to augment the building fund, to which he offered £1000 on the basis of £1 for every £2 raised locally. Walter J. Whitchell promised £500 for the building fund should the balance be found when the fund held only £760. With the building costed at £3,500, an appeal for funds from the public was launched. Despite the onset of the Depression, £3,250 was raised in only six weeks from private individuals and companies the Bank of Australasia, Ball & Welch and Bryant & May, augmented by the promised State government grant of £1,000, and afterward a further £500. With furnishings, the total cost was £4,132.

Architect Percy Meldrum, who trained in the United States presented to a reluctant management committee a "modern and artistic" design for the Castlemaine Art Gallery and Historical Museum (as it was then named) in an American Art-deco style. The main gallery walls and those of both additional gallery spaces were naturally and indirectly lit from the concealed windows of a saw-tooth roof above suspended ceilings.

The entry steps are Harcourt granite, the parapet of Malmsbury bluestone, and Barker's Creek slate pave the forecourt, on which rest two cuboid planters decorated with panels showing native animals in a sympathetic style by textile artist and sculptor Michael O’Connell who also provided planters and ornaments to Buda's garden. 

A "Jazz" style frieze that combines Egyptian and Central American motifs and fluting decorates the parapet, front wall and tympanum over the central front door, itself recessed behind ornate wrought-iron grille gates. The symmetrical facade includes a bas-relief in artificial stone featuring a female figure that symbolises Castlemaine surrounded, on the right, by two attendant gold-miners of the past, and artist and sculptor at left. It was designed and carved by Orlando H. Dutton (1894-1962), an English-born artist working in Australia after 1920.

The opening was held on the 18th of that month by the Governor of Victoria Lord Somers at a ceremony conducted in front of a crowd at the entrance to the Gallery that flowed across the street. It was reported as far away as Canada that;In opening the art gallery, in the presence of a very large gathering, Lord Somers said that he had been amazed at seeing a gallery and a collection so fine. He did not suppose that a gallery of those dimensions would be found in a town of that size anywhere else in the British Dominions. Extraordinary enthusiasm must have been shown to make the gallery possible.Visitor numbers during 1933 increased to 10,000.

P. S. Markham and Professor Henry C. Richards, touring Australia on behalf of the Carnegie Corporation of New York, reported that the Gallery was "a credit to all concerned ... After Port Sunlight, where Lord Lever's art collection is housed, this small town has probably a better art gallery than any comparable town in the British Empire."

Additions

By 1938 space proved insufficient for special exhibitions and to accommodate the program of public galleries lending artworks and circulating exhibitions amongst them. At Castlemaine that necessitated dismounting the existing collection and storing while a temporary exhibition was on display. The burgeoning collection posed storage problems; in 1942 Sir John Higgins' bequest of his pictures, china, glassware and furniture, could not be housed and the committee was forced to make plans for extensions to be part-funded by his sister Catherine's bequest of £8,300. However, it was not spent due to war and post-war impediments to building.

1960

Impetus for a new extension did not gather until 1956, when the possibility of an internal paved courtyard for sculpture was considered. But only in 1959 was a decision reached to complete the project though the cost had risen to £16,000, beyond the means of the Gallery. The Bolte ministry promised a subsidy on a pound for pound basis and in late 1960 the adjacent Presbyterian Church donated a strip of land for driveway access to the rear of the building, enabling work to commence. The resulting Higgins Gallery was opened on 23 September 1961, by Dr Leonard Cox, Chairman of Trustees of the National Gallery of Victoria, and it included storerooms, work areas, and shelving and sliding racks for storage of artworks.

1973

A third space for special and temporary exhibitions was funded by a gift of $12,500 from the Stoneman Foundation after which it is named, and a State Government grant of $26,000 and was opened by Premier Rupert Hamer on 14 September 1973, on the occasion of the Gallery's sixtieth anniversary.

1987
Renovations and additions completed since include a storeroom and workspace areas, added in 1987 and named the A & B Sinclair Building Extensions, after inaugural Director Beth Sinclair and her husband, and were opened by the Hon Race Matthews MLA, Minister for the Arts. This renovation included an extension to the Museum below, named the Percy Chaster Building for his bequest to the gallery.

2000
Grants from the Department of Communication, Technology and the Arts were distributed by the Federal government for the Centenary of Federation in 1999, denounced by some commentators as pork-barrelling, from which Castlemaine Art Gallery and Historical Museum received $2,000,000 for upgrades and redevelopment by architect Allom Lovell. The 1973 addition at the rear of the building was gutted and turned into the temporary exhibitions gallery with international museum standard climate and lighting controls, and security systems enabling Castlemaine to borrow major national and international works and travelling exhibitions. The high vaulted ceiling naturally lit via UV-filtered skylights has a hidden shutter system to permit blacking out for exhibitions that require artificial lighting only. An artificially lit small prints and drawings gallery is, since 2020, set aside for CAM's Orbit program; a series of exhibitions by artists who live and work in Central Victoria. Other works included a conservation studio for the treatment and restoration of works of art and historical documents, renovation of the Gallery and Museum shop, and a substantial mezzanine at the rear of the building for new offices, and a research library, the latter named after A. G. Lloyd-Stephenson whose bequest added substantially to its collection of art books. During these year-long renovations, the Gallery and Museum were temporarily relocated to the Gallery's old quarters above the Post Office. Completed in late 2000, the extensions were opened on 6 October by the Hon Peter McGauran, Federal Minister for the Arts and Centenary of Federation.

Forming the collection

Policy 

While its building was assertively Modern, attitudes prevailing during the 1930s and 1940s meant that the collection of works within remained conservative. One artist, and one of the wealthiest, associated with the Gallery, A.M.E. Bale was vehement in her distaste for anything 'modern,' echoing the views of then National Gallery of Victoria director James Stuart MacDonald who, of the 1939 Herald exhibition of contemporary French and English painting sponsored by Sir Keith Murdoch, proclaimed, 'They are exceedingly wretched paintings ... putrid meat ... the product of degenerates and perverts ... filth'. A demonstration of these conservative values was the Gallery's 1933 commission to have painter W B Mclnnes travel to England to paint portraits of the Duke and Duchess of York (later King George VI). Numbers of 20th-century artists represented were members of the conservative, anti-modernist Australian Academy of Art (1937–1946), while others joined its rival the Contemporary Art Society. 

It was not until 1946 with the purchase for 175 guineas (A$13,000 in 2020) of Desolation, painted the same year by Russell Drysdale, a dark expressionist work, that this attitude changed. When added to existing holdings of 105 oils, 57 water colours and 76 etchings, drawings and prints, the purchase was welcomed by Clive Turnbull, since 1942 the Murdoch-appointed art critic at the Herald, who considered the cost ...
... a good price by any Australian standards. The gallery's committee has shown its enterprlse and the courage of its convictions in buying what ranks as a "modern" work. "Desolation," as this large oil is called, is one of the series painted by Russell Drysdale — in some peoples' view the most significant of all contemporary Australian artists — after his visit to the erosion country of New South Wales last year. In rich, dark colors, it is typical and good Drysdale of this period. The foreground is dominated by a huge twisted tree form. A picture of the power and quality of this one obviously presents considerable difficulties in hanging in a small gallery it is destructive of neighboring works which are merely pretty or superficially representational, and one hardly supposes that the placing of it will be entirely satisfactory until there are enough works of kindred character and quality to keep it company [...] Castlemaine is to be congratulated on having obtalned this picture.
Even so, the purchase coincided with that of Rupert Bunny's semi-allegorical 1932 Stepping Stones, and the policy remained still to prefer figurative studies, landscape and portraiture, but to permit semi-abstract works.

Funding 
Lack of funds has historically handicapped the Gallery's acquisitions of significant works of art. After WWI it survived on subscribers, door takings and a government grant of £20 per annum, and finances were particularly strained when it had found a permanent home during a period coinciding with the Great Depression, when all government funding was withdrawn until 1935.  Nevertheless, bequests were forthcoming, such as that for the portrait of Edna Thomas, by John Longstaff, funded from the will of F. McKillop, editor of the Castlemaine Mail.  It relied also on direct donations of works, such as Billy McInnes's large canvas Ploughing and etchings by Norman Lindsay given by Sir Baldwin Spencer, and Dame Nellie Melba's gifts of a portrait of her father David Mitchell by Hugh Ramsey and Frederick McCubbin's Golden Sunlight. Locals contributed to special subscription funds in order to secure desirable works unlikely to be donated, as they did in 1925 for Charles Wheeler's The Last Ray.

Other works have been acquired by exchange; for example The Australian War Memorial's provision of duplicates of two Will Dyson lithographs in return for an Eric Kennington portrait of Hughie Edwards, the highly decorated Second World War airman. The Australian Government's Taxation Incentives for the Arts Scheme provided for other donations.

In 1916 an annual state government grant of a mere £30 ($2,836.00 value in 2020) was " ... to be spent on pictures, and pictures only." By 1937 this had been raised to £100, with the municipality contributing only £6.

In 1980, former Director Perry wrote in complaint to James Mollison of the National Gallery of Australia objecting to one of its purchases at auction when both galleries were the only bidders beyond $11,000 for Margaret Preston's 1925 Still Life, which went to Canberra for a record price of $17,000. Perry felt the richer rational gallery should have withdrawn to let the work through to a less prosperous smaller institution.

Government funding tended to be piecemeal; deputations to MPs during the war years and another during the Depression received minor dispensation, $319 from the Australia Council in 1985 was given for "purchase of crafts for public display and permanent collection", and in 1987 Minister for the Arts, Race Mathews, announced minor capital grants including $60,000 approved to enable the Castlemaine Art Gallery to extend its storage space. The Gallery and Museum received $2,325 in 1988, and then two years later a further $6,000, from the Australia Council for the Arts Visual Arts/Crafts Board for collections development, and in 1997, part of $2.5m through the state government's Victoria Organisations Funding program, shared with seven other arts institutions.

Management

Volunteers administered and managed the Castlemaine Art Gallery and Historical Museum for the first six decades of operations, opening Monday-Sunday 1-5pm and 2.30-5pm Sunday, but for a period having to close for lack of a caretaker. In 1962, the requirements of the Regional Galleries Association of Victoria necessitated the appointment of professional staff. This transition to being a managed cultural organisation was handled largely by Beth Sinclair (1919–2014) who, when she moved to Castlemaine in 1953, was introduced to the Gallery by her husband Alec who was on its committee. As reported in 1948 by Castlemaine Technical School lecturer in Art Colin Hunt to an audience at Horsham interested in repeating the success of Castlemaine Art Gallery and Museum;Women have been active in their support of the movement from its inception. They have contributed substantially to its success during the formative period, and are still active in committee. One holds the office of vice president and another leads the selection committee.Using her background in secretarial work she volunteered to catalogue works and organize the office systems. In 1963 Castlemaine hosted a meeting of the Victorian Public Galleries Association, and in May, Sinclair was able to announce that Castlemaine had secured its rating as one of four 'A' class regional galleries and would retain its government funding.

Sinclair was appointed the Gallery's first Director in 1969, and was the first woman to be a public gallery director in Australia. She was rigorous in her management of the collection and the daily running of the Gallery, and established a network of individuals and organisations all over Australia for purchases and loans of artworks and a regular schedule of exhibitions. A significant acquisition of contemporary art, made in her first year as Director, was Fred Williams' Silver Landscape, painted 1968 In 2000, after her retirement in 1975 and in celebration of the extensive renovations Sinclair donated her personal collection of Australian art, including watercolour landscapes by Reginald Sturgess, works by Rick Amor, E. W. Syme and other painters, which was presented in the inaugural exhibition The Beth Sinclair Donation of Australian Art in the new temporary exhibitions gallery. The north-east corner gallery was named in her honour.

When Sinclair retired, and on her recommendation, after he and his twin brother John, who had been collecting since their teens, held a 1974 exhibition of their collection of Australian paintings, the committee appointed Peter Perry as the next Director, at 23 years old the youngest in Australia, into the role he was to serve for thirty-eight years before his retirement in 2014. He was assisted by the Gallery's first curator Lauretta Zilles from 1986 to 1995 and Kirsten McKay, 1995 to 2014. In interview, Perry acknowledged the importance of women in the history of the gallery and its collection;
"The gallery was founded by women in 1913. They were women artists here or wives of local dignitaries and their war cry was 'No art, no culture; no culture, no nation'. We also had the first woman director appointed to an Australian public gallery: Beth Sinclair. It's not that we've pushed women artists. We just have that tradition and it's always been there. I've tended since my earliest days in the '70s to support research of women artists."
Perry also introduced musical recitals in the Gallery, and talks with presenters including James Mollison, then director of the National Gallery of Australia; and Dr. Eric Westbrook, then Director, Ministry of the Arts, for a champagne brunch talk on appreciation and enjoyment of art. In 2022 Perry was awarded a Medal of the Order of Australia (OAM) for his service in the museums and galleries field.

List of Directors
 1969 to 1975: Beth Sinclair 
 1975 to 2014: Peter Perry OAM
 2014 to 2017 Jennifer Kalionis
 2019: Naomi Cass (Director, CAM Renewal)

Renewal
In 2015, gallery members, for the purpose of accountability and compliance voted for the gallery to become incorporated. However a consequence was that income from the SR Stoneman Foundation a major annual philanthropic endowment, which had been worth $30,000 per year over 13 years, was lost due to its condition that the Gallery remain unincorporated. Thus, due to lack of funds, the Art Museum faced a forced closure on 11 August 2017. It was saved when a town hall meeting in Castlemaine on 2 August announced a $50,000 gift from the Macfarlane Fund, launched concomitantly in honour of the late businessman Don Macfarlane, for whom the gallery was his favourite, and given on the condition of greater support from Mount Alexander council. Combined with a $250,000 donation by an anonymous couple, by fundraising efforts amongst local supporters, and a government grant,  the money meant the gallery would remain open to the public giving time for sustainable revenue to be sourced, though difficulties, as identified by The Institute of Community Directors Australia, remained.

Naomi Cass, previously director of the Centre for Contemporary Photography, was appointed Director, CAM Renewal, in January 2019, reopened the gallery, free of charge to visitors at the request of the benefactors and, after some refurbishment in November, in December launched the Strategic Plan for Castlemaine Art Museum 2019-2023 — connecting people through Art, History and Ideas In the 2019-20 financial year the budget returned to surplus.

Outreach

In 2019, CAM commenced a pilot inclusivity program to engage with three communities impeded in attending and enjoying CAM; First Nations young people, people with disability, and young people at risk. Participants were recruited through Nalderun, the Mount Alexander Shire Disability Advocacy Group, the local hospital and local school teachers. Ideas were received concerning solutions to increasing accessibility and relevance.

In 2021 the Art Museum updated its website, including online access and searching of its collection. Reflections, a series of commentaries on works from members of the gallery's community is included.

From 2020 the Museum held 'Orbit;' shows by significant local artists in its Benefactor's gallery, moving later to the Sinclair gallery, and in 2022 commenced a series of public 'Terrace Projections;' digital video projected onto its facade during night-time hours.

Awards and Prizes 
As early as 1928 Castlemaine Art Gallery offered a generous acquisitive prize of 40 guineas (A$3,484.70 value in 2020) for "the best oil or watercolour painting submitted, the works to be judged by Sir John Longstaff." The biennial $3,000 James Farrell Self Portrait Award was founded in 1991, but is longer being held. The biannual Clunes Ceramic Award, jointly offered by the Art Gallery of Ballarat and the Castlemaine Art Museum with a total prize money of $5000 was last opened in 2019 and was then postponed.  In 2021Castlemaine Art Museum continued to encourage artists with the following awards:

Experimental Print Prize 
Established in 2019, a biennial, non-acquisitive prize. Open to Victoria-resident artists resident in Victoria, an anonymous local donor provides three prizes: $10,000, $5,000 and $3,000 for an emerging artist.

Len Fox Painting Award
The Len Fox Painting Award is the Castlemaine Art Museum's $50,000 biennial acquisitive award and among the richest in the nation. It is awarded to a living Australian artist to commemorate the life and work of Emmanuel Phillips Fox, the uncle of Len Fox, partner of CAM benefactor Mona Fox.

Associations
CAM is a member of the Public Galleries Association of Victoria and is accredited by the Australian Museums and Galleries Association.

Exhibitions

1913–1920
 1913, 22–25 October: Loan Exhibition, Castlemaine Town Hall
 1914, October: Fifty Medici Society coloured photographic reproductions of Old Masters 14th–19th century, on loan from Bendigo Art Gallery
 1915, from 2 November: Watercolours by Reginald Sturgess and Miss M. Townsend

1921–1960
 1926, June: 21 recent acquisitions and 25 works on loan
1928, 22 October: Art Prize: 51 entries in watercolour or oil, winner William Rowell
1933, 3 December: Unveiling of W. B. Mclnnes portrait of the Duke of York, officiated by General Sir Henry Chauvel
 1935, June: Exhibition of Prints
 1946, June: Contemporary Sydney Painters
 1947, January: British contemporary paintings, loan from National Gallery of Victoria
 1948, 6–27 November: Contemporary Art of South Australia : Exhibition of Paintings
 1951, 21–30 August: DUNLOP PRIZE WINNING COLLECTION OF AUSTRALIAN ART
 1952/3, 9 December–3 February: Castlemaine Residents' Art Exhibition: 40 paintings from 38 district homes

1961–1970
 1963, July: Junior Art Prize
 1963, 1 September: Prints '63, Studio One Printmakers, Tate Adams, Barbara Brash, Janet Dawson, Grahame King, Hertha Kluge-Pott, Jan Senbergs, Fred Williams
 1963, November: Exhibition of Religious and Applied Art
 1964, 5–7 November: First Castlemaine National Exhibition of Photography
 1966, 3–5 November: Third Castlemaine National Exhibition of Photography
 1967, 19–21 October: Fourth Castlemaine National Exhibition of Photography
 1968, 7–9 November: Fifth Castlemaine National Exhibition of Photography
 1969, 6–8 November: Sixth Castlemaine National Exhibition of Photography

1971–1980
 1971, 15–31 March: Rosemary Fazakerley
 1971, 6–8 May: Seventh Castlemaine National Exhibition of Photography
 1972, 29 April–21 May 1972: An exhibition of fifty chairs of the 19th and early 20th centuries
 1974, September: Die Basler Fasnacht: A collection of drawings on the theme of the traditional March carnival in Basel, Switzerland
 1975, 24 March–15 November: Arts Victoria Statewide Festival 
 1975, 2 May–22 June: Artists and Central Victoria, for Arts Victoria '74
 1975, 15 August–22 September: The Meldrum School
 1975, 7 November – 5 December: Crafts Victoria 75: a survey of contemporary crafts in Victoria
 1976, 12 March–12 April: Cartoons Political + Non Political
 1976, 14 April–5 May: Erica Beilharz and Helen Harrison: Fibre and Form
 1976, 16 May – 27 June: Self portraits
 1976: Reginald Sturgess, 73 works
 1976, 16 October–28 November: A.E. Newbury
 1977, 13 Apr–1 May: The Callow Collection: Watercolours by Constable, Turner, Cox, Rowlandson and Sandby
 1977, 7 May-29 May: Dora Serle: an exhibition of paintings and drawings
 1977, 12 June–3 July: Elsie Barlow 1876 -1948 
 1977, 11 September-30 October: A.M.E. Bale
 1978, 5–31 March: The Leviny Family, an early craft family of Castlemaine: silver, jewellery, design, embroidery, enamelling
 1978 10 June-1 July: Marc Clark: sculptures 1968-78
 1978, 22 August–4 September: Tribal And Traditional Textiles. The 1978 National Gallery of Victoria Travelling Exhibition
 1978, 10–29 September: The Newell family
 1978, 1–29 October: The Colquhouns: a creative and productive family
 1978, 4–26 November: Fibre craft work by local artisans
 1979, to 3 June: Art metal craft by S. J. Ellis, craftsman and teacher
 1979, 12 September-10 October: Aspects of Australian Art 1900-1940: Australian National Gallery Touring exhibition
 1980, 13 April–25 May: James McNeill Whistler:Notes, nocturnes & harmonies
 1980, 3–24 August: 20th Anniversary Exhibition of the Embroiderer's Guild

1981–1990
 1981, 8 March–5 April: Merryle Johnson 
 1981, to 10 May: Castlemaine Art Gallery and Historical Museum 50th Anniversary: Royal Doulton Ceramic Ware
 1981, 19 July–23 August: Five Australian Expatriates: Bunny, Coates, Longstaff, Meldrum & Quinn
 1981, 6 September-4 October: Two centuries of Australian bird illustrations
 1981, 25 October–23 November: Aspects of Castlemaine, 1854-1980
 1982, 24 March–2 May: Twenty years of acquisitions, 1962-1982
 1982, 8 May- 27 June: Pictures from Private Collections
 1982, 12 August–5 September: E. Phillips Fox and Ethel Carrick: An Exhibition of Impressionist Landscapes
 1983, June: Frater and Shore: Pioneer Modernists
 1983, 22 August–12 September: Print Council Exhibition 10
 1983, 18 September–23 October: Polly Hurry, 1883-1963: a retrospective
 1983: David Chapman 1927-1983: works on paper
 1984, to 1 April: Works by Edward B. Heffernan
 1984, 6 May–2 June 1984: Kathlyn Ballard, 1946-1984
 1984, 1 November–2 December: Russell Drysdale
 1985, 2 March–31 March: Selected Works from the Diamond Valley Art Collection
 1985, 21 July-11 August: Sydney: a frame of mind: photographs by Graeme Dawes
 1985 18 August–15 September: Fifty Chairs of the 18th, 19th and 20th Centuries 
 1986: Victoria, views by contemporary artists
 1986, 13–30 July: Margaret Pestell 1894–1984
 1986, 13 September–5 October: Painters, Potters, Printmakers & Photographers from Castlemaine and District
 1986, to 7 December: R. W. Sturgess, Watercolorist 1892-1932
 1987, 5 April – 3 May: Pubs and breweries of Castlemaine and district
 1987, 20 September–25 October: Harley C. Griffiths, 1908–1981
 1987, 12 October – 31 October: Trefor Prest: Sculpture
 1987, December: Central Victorian Sculptors
 1988, 16 September - 23 October: An Aspect of Australian Art: Three Private Collections in Central Victoria
 1988, September: Selection from 30 years of acquisitions
 1988, 29 October - 20 November: Shotei lbata
 1988, 29 October–4 December: Miles Evergood, 1871-1939: retrospective
 1989, January: Percy Leason, 1889-1959: centenary exhibition
 1989, 5–27 August: 9x5 CENTENARY EXHIBITION
 1990, 13 July–5 August: The Sybil Craig Bequest
 1990, 10 August–2 September: Iskustvo: Recent Soviet painting
 1990, November: Aspects of France: the Australian Artists View, 50 works by Australian artists from John Peter Russell to Lloyd Rees
 1990, to 2 December: Annemieke Mein: Textiles

1991–2000
 1991, April: Maladies, medicos & miracle cures: a guide to the history of medicine in Castlemaine and district from 1851- c.1950
 1991, 16 June–7 July: Harley Griffiths Snr. (1878-1951): works on paper
 1991, 14 July–11 August: Rupert Bunny's Landscapes of the South of France
 1991: 25 August–15 September: Arthur J. Lindsay, 1912-1990: retrospective
 1991, 13 October–3 November: Ten regional artists: Steve Beckley, Liz Caffin, Paul Cavell, Ian Drummond, John Gleeson, Craig Gough, Douglas Green, Juliana Hilton, Ken Killeen, Vicky Taylor
 1991, November: Nature's Inspiration: Arts in the Garden
 1992, to 3 May: A history of horticulture in Castlemaine and district
 1992, 13 July–20 August: Completing the picture: women artists and the Heidelberg era
 1992, 20 September – 25 October: The Art of Christian Waller
 1992, 31 October – 6 December: Gwyn Hanssen Pigott: ceramics
 1992, 31 October – 6 December: Harold Herbert, Watercolours 1918-44
 1993, March–April: Religion in the Goldfields
 1993, 18 June–17 July: Wendy Stavrianos
 1993 to 29 August: Ray Taylor: Ceramic Artist
 1993, to 12 September: Greg Stirling: Enchanted Wood
 1994, 6 March – 10 April: Flynn silver, past and present
 1994, 15 May-12 June: Wendy Stavrianos: Mantles of Darkness
 1994, to 2 October: Charles Bush: Self Portraits 1936–1986
 1994, 29 October-4 December: John Dent: retrospective 1973-1993
 1995, 5 March–30 April: Australian Women Printmakers 1910–1940, curated by Kirsten McKay of the Castlemaine gallery, touring exhibition
 1996: Historic wallpapers in Australia, 1850-1920
 1996, 30 March–5 May: Rosemary Fazakerley 1941-1992: A memorial exhibition
 1996, 2 November – 8 December: Tony Lloyd-Stephenson: 1921-1994
1997: Mt. Alexander Printmakers' Show
 1997: 2 February–30 March: Sculpture by Fiona Orr, 1979-1997: a journey, abstraction to figuration to landscape
 1997, 12 October – 23 November: Australian artists influenced by Rembrandt
 1998: Jan Lancaster: Bloodlines- The Coliban
 1998 Janet Goodchild-Cuffley, Women of History
 1998, 9–30 August: Achievement Through Art, Student Art Exhibition Regional Tour, works of students in Years 4-10
 1999, to 11 April: The Private Eye A Foreigner's Power of Observation: contemporary artworks by Vicki McConville sourcing the cultural and historical archives of Central Victoria
 1999, 24 April–4 May: Ian Armstrong Retrospective
 1999, 27 June – 2 August: Pam Hallandal: drawings
 2000, 4 October – 10 December: The Beth Sinclair Donation of Australian Art

2001–2010
 2001, 24 March to 29 April: Fraser Fair retrospective
 2001, 27 May to 1 July: Murray Griffin – the journey: a retrospective 1922-1980
 2002, 9 March-7 April: Peter Wegner: sitting still, portrait studies of Graeme Doyle
 2002, 6 April – 19 May: Martin Lewis: stepping into the light
 2002, 28 July – 25 August: A tribute to June Davies
 2003: David Tatnall, Seeing the Forest for the Trees
 2003, 29 March-4 May: Highlights from the Stuart R. Stoneman art collection
 2003, 10 May – 8 June: Basil Eliades: Isolated connections: the landscape politic	
 2003, 6 July – 24 August: John Julian Gibbs, 1859-1887
 2004, 1 May–6 June: As time goes by: Prints by Marc Clark
 2004, 3 October–21 November: Alexander Colquhoun: 1862-1941: artist and critic.
 2005: Gus Cohen
 2005, 2 April–1 May: Venezia Australis. Australian artists in Venice: 1900-2000
 2006, 4 March–2 April: Eric Thake 1904–82: Works from the Permanent Collection
 2006, 4 March–2 April: Tom Roberts: 150th birthday anniversary
 2006, 2 April–28 May: Australian Printmaking, 1960s to the Present Day
 2006, 4 June–30 July: Sybil Craig 1901-89: Modernist painter
 2006/7, 19 November–21 January: Dorothy Mary Braund: retrospective
 2007, 17 February–18 March: Robert Clinch: Urban Myths
 2007, 31 March–27 May: The Art of the Dog
 2007, 9 June–29 July: European sensibilities: George Baldessin and his circle
 2008, 5 April–18 May: Deborah Klein: Out of the past, a survey of works 1995-2007
2008, to 31 August: Dick Turner : Cross Sections Layering Land and Culture
 2008, 4 October – 2 November: Donald Ramsay, artist in a landscape: a survey exhibition
 2008, 8 November to 14 December: Jock Clutterbuck: Sculptures & drawings 1990-2008
 2009, 24 January–1 March: Clifton Pugh: printmaker
 2009: Jack Courier (1915–2007): lithographs
 2010, 28 February – 4 April:Associates of Rupert Bunny
 2010, from 23 April: Archie & Amalie Colquhoun
 2010, 11 September–3 October: Annette Edwards ... a lifetime of mark making
 2010, 13 November—19 December: Mount Alexander Shire artists represented in the permanent collection

2011–2020
 2011, 15 January – 27 February: Imagining the Orient: A National Gallery of Victoria Touring Exhibition
 2011, 2 April – 8 May: Touring exhibition Scottish painters in Australia
 2011, 18 June – 24 July: Douglas Watson (1920–72) Works from the Permanent Collection
 2011, 18 June – 24 July: Victor Majzner: Location watercolours from Australia and Overseas
 2011, 10 September – 23 October: Greg Moncrieff: now and then – : a survey exhibition of selected paintings, screen prints and mixed media works from 1974 to the present
 2012, 14 January—26 February: Peggy Shaw: A Retrospective
 2012, 10 March—29 April: Ray Pearce: Bite
 2012, 5 May—24 June: Max Middleton: Painter of Light
 2012, 1 July—29 July: Richard Crichton Profile: Selected Works
 2012, 4 August—2 September: Jeff Makin: Drawings
 2012, 9 September—28 October: John Borrack: Selected Paintings and Drawings 1970-2012
2012, to 9 December: Susan Weste: Elements of Nature; Meanderings With a Camera
2013, 5 January—3 February: Director's Choice: Thirty-eight years of collecting
2013, 9 February—10 March: R W Sturgess (1892–1932) Works from the Permanent Collection
2013, 16 March—26 May: Barry Singleton: A Survey from Public and Private Collections and an Exhibition of Current Work
2013, 16 March-26 May: Mediterranean Summers: Australian Artists along the French and Italian Coast
2013, 1 June—28 July: Rick Amor, from Study to Painting
 2013, 3 August–15 September: A collective vision: prints from the Castlemaine Art Gallery permanent collection 1970–2013: a selection of works from the 1970s to 2013 celebrating the role of artists, collectors and benefactors
2013, 21 September—10 November: Shimmering Light: Dora Meeson and the Thames
2013, 16 November—31 December: 2013 Len Fox Painting Award
2013, 3 November—9 December: Ray Stanyer and Ellen Hansa- Wither shall I wander?
2013, 23 November—15 December: The Art of Jock Clutterbuck
2104, 1 January—23 February: Acquisitions
2014, 1 January—23 February: Dorothy Braund 1927-2013: Gouaches from the Permanent Collection
2014, 2–21 August: Ray Hearn: A Survey 2004 – 2014
 2014, 1 Mar–13 Apr: Wayne Viney, Singular Impressions
 2014, 26 Apr–1 Jun: Ann Geroe: Ceramics Survey
 2014, 3 May–7 Jun: Jennie Stewart: Works on Paper 
 2014, 7 June–27 July: Dean Bowen Day by Day – Paintings, Sculpture, Prints and Drawings
 2014, 2–31 Aug: Ray Hearn: A Survey 2004 – 2014
 2014, 2–31 Aug: Peter Wegner: 1000 Years- 10 Drawings of Centenarians
 2014, 6 Sep–26 Oct: Ludmilla Meilerts Retrospective
 2014, 2 Nov–14 Dec: Bill Meyer: Nurturing the Place
2015, 15 January—8 March: Ginger Riley: The Boss of Colour
 2015, 28 February: Catherine Pilgrim. Making history: Hidden world of the Leviny women.
2015, 13 March – 22 March: Patrick Pound: The Museum of Holes
2015, 2 May – 28 June: EARTH, FIRE AND WATER: 50 years of shaping the elements. Ceramics from the Castlemaine Art Gallery & Historical Museum permanent collection.
2015, 2 May – 28 June: Recent Drawings: Christine Hooper
 2015, 4 July – 23 August: "Jeremy Barrett: Survey Exhibition"
 2015, 17 July–31 August: ST Gill: Life on the Goldfields
2015, 29 August – 18 October: Inking Up | Rona Green, Deborah Klein & Clayton Tremlett
 2015, 29 August–18 October: Contemporary Australian Silver & Metalwork Award 2015
 2015: 31 Oct–31 Dec: David Moore: Glimpses of Chewton
 2015: 31 Oct–31 Dec: Women of Gold
 2016, 15 Jan–15 Apr:  Ben Quilty: After Afghanistan 2016
 2016, 30 Apr–30 Jun: Bill Henson: Landscapes
 2016, 10 Jul–15 Aug: Clayton Tremlett: Beard and Influence
 2016, 21 Aug–25 Sep: Slipstitch
 2017, 15 Jan–26 Feb: Michael Doolan: World Without World 
 2017, 15 Jan–26 Feb: Minna Gilligan: Groove is in the Heart
 2017: 19 Mar–25 Jun: John Nixon: Experimental Painting Workshop
 2017, 15–22 July Oct: Gifted: The Kohane and Moore donations of Australian studio ceramics
2017/18, 11 November—5 February: Daughters of the Sun: Christian Waller and Klytie Pate
2019, 8 June—1 September: 2019 Len Fox Painting Award
2019/20, 6 December—1 May: Experimental Print Prize
2020, 27 —29 November: the Way-the Water-the Walk (Reserved for the Convenience or Pleasure of the People)
2019/20, 11 October—11 October: The Unquiet Landscape

Since 2020
2020/21, 1 May – 9 March: Cast Recast: Damon Moon
2020/21, 17 May – 9 March: Janina Green in conversation with the Collection
 2020–2022, 31 May–1 Jan: From the Land: Peter Banjurljurl (Jinang), Batumbil Bararrwanga (Gumatj), Gabi Briggs (Anaiwan and Gumbangier)and Arika Waulu (Gunai and Gunditjmara), Alvin Darcy Briggs (Yorta Yorta, Taungwurrung), Blackgin (Wurundjeri), John Hunter Kerr, Nonggirrnga Marawili (Madarrpa, Yithuwa), Malalakpuy Munyarryan (Wanggurri) Baluka Maymuru (Manggalili, Belang group), Lorna Fencer Napurrula (Warlpiri), Betty Kuntiwa Pumani (Pitjantjatjara, Yankunytjatjara), Charlie Marabinyin, Ginger Riley Munduwalawala (Marra), Tashara Roberts (Dja Dja Wurrung, Yorta Yorta), works by unknown makers from the Castlemaine Art Museum, Mulkun Wirrpanda (Dhudi-Djapu, Dha-malamirr), Yumitjin Wunumurra (Dhalwangu, Narrkala)
 2020/21, 23 Nov–24 November: Cloudy – a few isolated showers: Lyndell Brown and Charles Green, Mira Gojak, Katrin Koenning, Vipoo Srivilasa, Will Ashton, Ros Bandt, W Rubery Bennett, Lina Bryans, Ernest Buckmaster, Rupert Bunny, Louis Buvelot, Murray Griffin, Hans Heysen, Frederick McCubbin, W B McInnes, Dora Meeson, Robert Vere Scott, Vipoo Srivilasa, Munuy'gnu Marika (Rirratjigna), Naminapu #2 Maymuru (Mangalili), Edwin Stocqueler, R W Sturgess, Verey & Co, Roland Wakelin.
2020/21, 26 December —31 January: Kylie Banyard – Holding Ground, Orbit Gallery
 2021, 19 March–19 September: James Henry: 18 Families
 2021, 19 March—17 October, #Perempuan 2021 – Contemporary Indonesian Art
2021, 19 March—2 May: Harry Nankin – The Fall, Orbit Gallery
2021, 4 February—7 March: Ilka White – here now, Orbit Gallery
 2021–2022, 19 March–17 February: Melinda Harper: In Conversation with the Collection
2021, 6 May—30 May: Minaal Lawn – 173 Forms, Orbit Gallery
2021, 10 June—4 July: David Frazer – Wood Engravings, Orbit Gallery
2021, 8 July—22 August: Orbit: Tashara Roberts – Your Skin My Skin, Orbit Gallery
2021/22, 13 November-28 February: 2021 Experimental Print Prize
2021-2022:  SINCLAIR+GALLERY, Peter Tyndall
2022, 12 March—13 June: Len Fox Painting Prize 2022
2022–2023 23 June—26 February: Reflections on the Castlemaine Art Museum Collection
2022–2023, 5 March–5 March: There is a certain slant of light: works from the Collection

Publications

Gallery of works in the CAM collection (pre-1955)

References

Art museums and galleries in Victoria (Australia)
1913 establishments in Australia
Art museums established in 1913
Art Deco architecture in Australia
Australian art
Arts organizations